David Martín Lozano (born 2 January 1977) is a Spanish water polo player who competed in the 2008 and 2012 Summer Olympics.

See also
 List of World Aquatics Championships medalists in water polo

References

External links
 

1977 births
Living people
Spanish male water polo players
Olympic water polo players of Spain
Water polo players at the 2008 Summer Olympics
Water polo players at the 2012 Summer Olympics
World Aquatics Championships medalists in water polo
Spanish water polo coaches
Spain men's national water polo team coaches
Water polo coaches at the 2020 Summer Olympics
21st-century Spanish people